EchoStar X, also known as EchoStar 10, is an American geostationary communications satellite which is operated by EchoStar on behalf of Dish Network. It is positioned in Geostationary orbit at a longitude of 110° West, from where it is used to provide direct broadcasting services to the United States.

EchoStar X was built by Lockheed Martin, and is based on the A2100AXS satellite bus.

The satellite was launched using a Sea Launch Zenit-3SL carrier rocket flying from the Ocean Odyssey launch platform. The launch occurred at 23:34:55 GMT on 15 February 2006, leaving Echostar X in a geosynchronous transfer orbit. Its orbit was then raised using an onboard LEROS-1C apogee motor, with insertion into geostationary orbit occurring at 20:50 GMT on 22 February.

See also

2006 in spaceflight

References

External links

Spacecraft launched in 2006
Spacecraft launched by Zenit and Energia rockets
Satellites using the A2100 bus
E10